Conospermum burgessiorum  is a plant of the family proteaceae native to eastern Australia.

References

External links

burgessiorum
Flora of New South Wales
Flora of Queensland